Pseudanapis is a genus of araneomorph spiders in the family Anapidae, first described by Eugène Simon in 1905. It is a senior synonym of "Gossiblemma" and "Amrishoonops".

Species
 it contains twelve species:
Pseudanapis aloha Forster, 1959 – Japan, Hawaii, Caroline Is., Australia (Queensland). Introduced to Britain, Germany
Pseudanapis amrishi (Makhan & Ezzatpanah, 2011) – Suriname
Pseudanapis benoiti Platnick & Shadab, 1979 – Congo
Pseudanapis domingo Platnick & Shadab, 1979 – Ecuador
Pseudanapis gertschi (Forster, 1958) – Mexico, Costa Rica, Panama
Pseudanapis hoeferi Kropf, 1995 – Brazil
Pseudanapis namkhan Lin, Li & Jäger, 2013 – Laos
Pseudanapis parocula (Simon, 1899) – Laos, Malaysia, Indonesia (Sumatra, Java)
Pseudanapis plumbea Forster, 1974 – Congo
Pseudanapis schauenbergi Brignoli, 1981 – Mauritius, Réunion
Pseudanapis serica Brignoli, 1981 – China (Hong Kong)
Pseudanapis wilsoni Forster, 1959 – New Guinea

References

Anapidae
Araneomorphae genera
Taxa named by Eugène Simon